Marcgravia umbellata, also called monkey paws, is a species of flowering vine in the family Marcgraviaceae. It is native to the Lesser Antilles islands in the eastern Caribbean and Anguilla.  They are part of the guild photoautotroph.
Marcgravia umbellata was the first member of the marcgraviaceae family to be described in modern botanical literature.

References

 Plants of the Eastern Caribbean entry
 Howard, R. 1974–1989. Flora of the Lesser Antilles.

External links

umbellata
Flora of the Leeward Islands
Flora of the Windward Islands
Vines
Plants described in 1753
Taxa named by Carl Linnaeus
Flora without expected TNC conservation status